São Tomé and Príncipe first competed at the Paralympic Games in 2016, at the Summer Games in Rio de Janeiro, Brazil. One wheelchair athlete was sent to compete in track and field events.
São Tomé and Príncipe has never taken part in the Winter Paralympic Games, and no athlete from the country has ever won a Paralympic medal.

Full results for São Tomé and Príncipe at the Paralympics

See also
 São Tomé and Príncipe at the Olympics

References

 
Sport in São Tomé and Príncipe